Antony Sweeney may refer to:

 Antony Sweeney (born 1983), footballer
 Antony G. Sweeney (born 1955), director of the Australian Centre for the Moving Image
 Tony Sweeney (c. 1931–2012), Irish horse racing journalist

See also
 Sweeney (name)